Mary Haviland Stilwell Kuesel sometimes spelled Stillwell-Kuesel (April 30, 1866 – June 22, 1936) was a pioneer American dentist. She was the founder of the Women's Dental Association of the United States, which she founded in 1892 with 12 charter members.

Biography
Mary Haviland Stilwell was born April 30, 1866 in Philadelphia, Pennsylvania. In 1892, she founded the Women's Dental Association of the U.S. with 12 charter members. 

In 1902, she married Dr. George C. Kuesel, a medical doctor. They were associate members of the Fairmount Park Art Association. She died June 22, 1936 in Philadelphia of coronary thrombosis. Her correspondence is held in a collection by the Historical Society of Pennsylvania.

See also

 Women in dentistry in the United States

References

Attribution

Bibliography
 
 
 
 

1866 births
1936 deaths
American dentists
Women dentists
Physicians from Philadelphia